Haziq Zikri (born 5 April 1991 in Kuala Lumpur) is a Malaysian footballer.

He recently played for Harimau Muda A in the Malaysia Super League.

Career
Haziq is Malaysian-born but raised in the United Kingdom. He was noticed by the Football Association of Malaysia in November 2008, and recruited to join the Football Association of Malaysia. The association gave Haziq a contract to play for the newly created, Harimau Muda that was set to join the 2009 Premier League season.

Haziq was officially part of the Harimau Muda squad in 2009. Haziq   later joined the Malaysia national under-19 team for the 2010 AFC U-19 Championship qualification. Harimau Muda later won the 2009 Premier League Malaysia.

After Harimau Muda was split into two teams and Haziq was chosen to play for the Harimau Muda A team. He left Harimau Muda A in July 2011 to join the former champions, Selangor FA alongside 3 others Harimau Muda players. Haziq will join Selangor on a loan for the Malaysia Cup.

Currently he is in United Kingdom to further his studies at the Hartpury College.

References

External links
 

1991 births
Living people
Malaysian footballers
Sportspeople from Kuala Lumpur
Association football forwards